During the 1936–37 season Hearts competed in the Scottish First Division, the Scottish Cup and the East of Scotland Shield.

Fixtures

Friendlies

Wilson Cup

East of Scotland Shield

Rosebery Charity Cup

Stirling Charity Cup

Scottish Cup

Scottish First Division

See also
List of Heart of Midlothian F.C. seasons

References

Statistical Record 36-37

External links
Official Club website

Heart of Midlothian F.C. seasons
Heart of Midlothian